Tyler Goodson (born November 10, 2000) is an American football running back for the Green Bay Packers of the National Football League (NFL). He played college football at Iowa.

Early life and high school
Goodson grew up in Suwanee, Georgia and attended North Gwinnett High School. He rushed for 1,437 yards and 25 touchdowns in his junior season. As a senior, Goodson rushed 159 times for 1,180 yards and 25 touchdowns and was named Georgia Player of the Year. He was rated a three-star recruit and committed to play college football at Iowa over offers from Nebraska, Iowa State, Indiana and Michigan State.

College career
As a true freshman, Goodson led Iowa with 134 attempts for 638 yards and five touchdowns while also catching 24 passes for 166 yards. He was named first-team All-Big Ten Conference after gaining 762 yards and scoring seven touchdowns on 143 carries in his sophomore season. In his junior season, he rushed for 1,151 rushing yards and six rushing touchdowns to go along with 31 receptions for 247 receiving yards and one receiving touchdown.

Statistics

Professional career

Goodson was signed by the Green Bay Packers as an undrafted free agent on May 2, 2022, shortly after the conclusion of the 2022 NFL Draft. He was waived on August 30, 2022, and signed to the practice squad the next day. On December 31, 2022, Goodson was elevated from the practice squad to the active roster. He signed a reserve/future contract on January 10, 2023.

References

External links
Green Bay Packers bio
Iowa Hawkeyes bio

2000 births
Living people
African-American players of American football
American football running backs
Green Bay Packers players
Iowa Hawkeyes football players
People from Suwanee, Georgia
Players of American football from Georgia (U.S. state)
Sportspeople from the Atlanta metropolitan area
21st-century African-American sportspeople
20th-century African-American sportspeople